"Everything to Me (ETM)" is the debut solo single by Irish singer-songwriter Shane Filan, released on 23 August 2013 in Ireland and 25 August 2013 worldwide, from his debut studio album You and Me. The single together with his other song "One of These Days" off the album were also featured on the soundtrack album of the British computer-animated comedy film Postman Pat: The Movie and released to UK radio stations afterwards.

The song was written by Shane Filan, Nick Atkinson and Tom Wilding.  It was produced by Martin Terefe. It topped Irish iTunes list on the day of release. The song peaked at number 7 on the Irish Singles Chart and number 14 on the UK Singles Chart. The single was included on the compilation albums For Mum With Love and Your Songs 2014.

Background
This is Filan's first release as a solo artist after being a lead singer of Westlife for 14 years. The lyrics talk about optimism. After Westlife disbanded in 2012, Filan was signed up as a solo artist by Capitol Records.

Music video
The video for the song shows Filan walking around a large land surrounded by planes with other people before waking up in a bed hung up on the wing of one of the planes.

Track listing

Chart performance

Weekly charts

Release history

References

External links
 Official site
 Lyrics at Shane Filan official website

2013 songs
2013 debut singles
Shane Filan songs
Songs written by Shane Filan
Songs written by Nick Atkinson
Capitol Records singles